The 1963 NHRA Winternationals (commonly known as the Winternats) were a National Hot Rod Association (NHRA) drag racing event held at the Auto Club Raceway in Pomona, California on February 17, 1963.

Events 
Jack Williams' new slingshot streamliner Scuderia made her debut at this year's Winternats, in Top Gas.  She also won the "Best Appearing" award.

Results

Top Fuel 
In the Top Fuel Dragster (TF/D) final round, Don Garlits (not yet nicknamed "Big Daddy") defeated Art Malone.

Altered

Top Gas 

The class win went to Bob Muravez (in the John Peters and Nye Frank owned Freight Train)over Connie Kalitta. The Freight Train also posted both top speed (185+) and low E.T. (8.36) for gas dragsters.

Competition Eliminator 
Tony Nancy defeated Jerry Hardick to win the Comp Eliminator.

Middle Eliminator 
Doug "Cookie" Cook claimed Middle Eliminator in his Oldsmobile-engined Willys, over Jim Dunn.

Junior Eliminator 
Hugh Tucker defeated Bob Culbert at Pomona in 1962 to win Junior Eliminator.

Little Eliminator 
Charlie Smith was defeated by Dick Bourgeois in Little Eliminator.

Super Stock

Stock 
In Stock Eliminator, Al Eckstrand in a 1963 Dodge defeated Bill Shirey in a 1963 Plymouth.

Notes 

 1963 in motorsport
NHRA Winternationals
1963 in California